Thomas Ward Darling (born May 4, 1958) is an American former competitive rower and Olympic silver medalist.  A 1981 graduate of Syracuse University, he was a member of the American men's eights team that won the silver medal at the 1984 Summer Olympics in Los Angeles, California.  Darling also participated in the men's coxed fours at the 1988 Summer Olympics and placed 5th overall.

2013 Winner of World Indoor Rowing Championship Age 50–54.

2014 Winner of World Indoor Rowing Championship Age 55–59.

2019 Winner C.R.A.S.H.-B. Indoor Rowing Championship Age 60–64. Setting the world record for this age group.

References

1958 births
Living people
Rowers at the 1984 Summer Olympics
Rowers at the 1988 Summer Olympics
Olympic silver medalists for the United States in rowing
American male rowers
Medalists at the 1984 Summer Olympics